Beldubi High School is a Bengali-medium school located in Howrah, West Bengal, India. Established in 1960, this is a co-educational school and is affiliated to the West Bengal Board of Secondary Education for Madhyamik Pariksha (10th Board exams), and to the West Bengal Council of Higher Secondary Education for Higher Secondary Examination (12th Board exams).

References 

High schools and secondary schools in West Bengal
Schools in Howrah district
1960 establishments in West Bengal
Educational institutions established in 1960